Deshabandu Sriyantha Dissanayake (also known as Sriyantha Subashan Abeysekara Dissanayake) is a Sri Lankan sprint athlete specializing in the 100 and 200 metres.

Early life and education
Sriyantha was a champion athlete during his school days at Nalanda College Colombo in the late 1980s. He became national champion at the age of eighteen and went on to win this honour 6 more times.

Career
Sriyantha Dissanayake won a silver and a bronze medal in 1990 Asian Games in Beijing and brought pride to Sri Lanka. In the 1991 South Asian Games held in Colombo he won  gold medals in both the 100 metre and 200 metre events. In addition, he gained two more gold medals and a silver in the 1993 South Asian Games in Dhaka.   Sriyantha also represented Sri Lanka in athletics at the 1992 Summer Olympics held in Barcelona, Spain.

He is arguably the best male sprinter to come from his island being the only Sri Lankan athlete to have won a 100-metre medal in the Asian games.

Honors
Sriyantha Dissanayake is Sri Lanka's first ever recipient of Duncan White award on 1 March 1991 presented by Duncan White himself.

In 1992, he was awarded the title of Deshabandu for services to his country by the late president R. Premadase.

References

External links
 

1969 births
Living people
Sri Lankan male sprinters
Sri Lankan Buddhists
Alumni of Nalanda College, Colombo
Olympic athletes of Sri Lanka
Asian Games medalists in athletics (track and field)
Athletes (track and field) at the 1992 Summer Olympics
Athletes (track and field) at the 1990 Asian Games
Deshabandu
Asian Games silver medalists for Sri Lanka
Asian Games bronze medalists for Sri Lanka
Medalists at the 1990 Asian Games
South Asian Games gold medalists for Sri Lanka
South Asian Games silver medalists for Sri Lanka
South Asian Games medalists in athletics